

This is a list of the National Register of Historic Places listings in Nantucket County, Massachusetts.

This is intended to be a complete list of the properties and districts on the National Register of Historic Places in Nantucket County, Massachusetts, United States. Latitude and longitude coordinates are provided for many National Register properties and districts; these locations may be seen together in a map.

There are 4 properties listed on the National Register in the county, including 2 National Historic Landmarks.  Another property was once listed but has been removed.

Current listings

|}

Former listing

|}

See also
 
 List of National Historic Landmarks in Massachusetts
 National Register of Historic Places listings in Massachusetts

References

 
Nantucket County
History of Nantucket, Massachusetts